Indium gallium arsenide phosphide is a quaternary compound semiconductor material, an alloy of gallium arsenide, gallium phosphide, indium arsenide, or indium phosphide. This compound has applications in photonic devices, due to the ability to tailor its band gap via changes in the alloy mole ratios, x and y.

Many devices operating in the near-infrared 1.55 μm wavelength window utilize this alloy, and are employed as optical components (such as laser transmitters, photodetectors and modulators) in C-band communications systems.

Fraunhofer Institute for Solar Energy Systems ISE reported a triple-junction solar cell utilizing . The cell has very high efficiency of 35.9% (claimed to be a record).

See also
 Indium gallium phosphide
 Gallium indium arsenide antimonide phosphide
 Solar cell efficiency

References

External links 
 http://www.ioffe.ru/SVA/NSM/Semicond/GaInAsP/

III-V semiconductors
Indium compounds
Gallium compounds
Arsenides
Phosphides